Dominic Gambo Yahaya (born January 10, 1950) is the current monarch of Atyap Chiefdom, a Nigerian traditional state in southern Kaduna State, Nigeria. He is also known by the title Agwatyap III.

Early life and education
Yahaya was born in Taligan, Atyapland, in the defunct Northern Region, British Nigeria (now southern Kaduna State, Nigeria) on 10 January 1950.

He began his educational career in 1958, attending St. Pius' (now LEA) Primary School, Taligan (Magamia) between 1958 and 1964; St. Mary's (now Government) Secondary School, Fadan Kaje between 1965 and 1969; Barewa College, Zaria between 1970 and 1971; and then proceeded for an advanced level education at Ahmadu Bello University, Zaria between 1972 and 1975, where he graduated with a B.Sc. (Hon.), Second Class Upper Division in Geography and between 1977 and 1979, obtained an M.Sc. in Urban and Regional Planning from the same institution. He has also attended several courses, workshops and seminars at home in Nigeria and overseas.

Yahaya married Miss Justina on November 30, 1979.

Career
Yahaya began working with the Kaduna State government after the year-long compulsory national service with the National Youth Service Corps, in 1976 and became:
Town Planning Officer II, in 1977;
Chief Town Planning Officer, 1987;
Kaduna State Director, Town and Country Planning in 1989;
General Manager, Kaduna State Urban Planning and Development Authority (KASUPDA) between 1990 and 1993.

He also became:
Caretaker Chairman of Kaduna North Local Government Area between April, 1994 - March, 1996.

Hence, he returned to work with:
The Bureau for Lands, Surveys and Country Planning of Kaduna State as Director, Town and Country Planning between 1996 and 1998.

He then became:
Permanent Secretary, Ministry of Water Resources, between January, 1999 - January, 2000;
Permanent Secretary, Ministry of Works and Transportation, February, 2000 - November, 2001;
Public Service Office, Office of the Head of Service Commission, Kaduna State between December, 2001 - September, 2003;
Public Service Office, Office of the Head of Service, State House, Kawo, between October, 2003 - January 10, 2010, where he retired from civil service.

Yahaya was then appointed as Chairman of the Interim Management Committee, Zangon Kataf Local Government Area between June 20, 2011 - November, 2012; and
Served as a member of the Governing Board of the National Youth Service Corps after retirement from civil service.

Memberships and awards

Memberships
Yahaya had been a de facto member of the:
Town Planning Registration Council (of Nigeria), since 1989; and
Fellow Nigerian Institute of Town Planners (FNITP)

He is also a registered Town Planner.

Awards
He was awarded:
National Productivity Merit Award in 1991; and 
Knight of Saint of Mulumba (KSM).

State detention
After the Zangon Kataf disturbances of May 1992 in which at least 21 indigenous Atyap people were arrested and left in detention without charge or trial under Decree 2 of 1984 enacted by the Nigerian military government, Dominic G. Yahaya (then a civil servant) was one of those unjustly detained and kept separately in a group of six before later being separated including Bala Ade Dauke (the then District Head of Zangon Katab and future Agwatyap I), Maj. Gen. Zamani Lekwot (rtd.), ACP Juri Babang Ayok (rtd.), Major John Atomic Kude (rtd.), and Peter Lekwot (younger brother to Maj. Gen. Z. Lekwot - who alongside Elias Manza and others were sentenced to death), as "Special Class" prisoners.

Enthronement
Yahaya, at the demise of Harrison Bungwon, Agwatyap II, was chosen to be the next Agwatyap of Atyap Chiefdom, to lead the Atyap people. On Saturday, November 12, 2016, he was handed over the staff of office by the Kaduna State governor in the Atak Njei palace.

References

External links

People from Kaduna State
Ahmadu Bello University alumni
Nigerian traditional rulers
African monarchs
Atyap people
1950 births
Monarchs of Atyap Chiefdom
Living people